National Lampoon's Ratko: The Dictator's Son is a 2010 American teen comedy film directed by Savage Steve Holland. The film was produced by Intermedia Films and Cinetel Films and was distributed by National Lampoon Inc. It was filmed in Vancouver, British Columbia.

The film was released direct to DVD on April 6, 2010.

Plot
Ratko Volvic (Efren Ramirez), the son of an affluent Eastern European dictator (Adam West), enrolls for the freshman semester at an American university. His exotic accent and hedonistic lifestyle soon establish him as the most colorful character on campus. But when Ratko falls hard for student activist Holly (Katrina Bowden), he begins to question his father's true character and where all his wealth actually came from.

Cast
Efren Ramirez as Ratko Volvic
Adam West as Kostka Volvic
Katrina Bowden as Holly
Ildiko Ferenczi as Shota Volvic
Lucia Oskerova as Teuta Volvic
Blake Anderson as Derek
Curtis Armstrong as Dushkan
Jeffrey Ballard as Jeremy
Tyler Boissonnault as Jason
Christine Danielle as Christine Connolly
Rob deLeeuw as B.J. Biff
John DeSantis as Skender
Adam Devine as Chris
Dennis Haskins as Dean Sitlong
Emily Ingersoll as Natalie
Victor Cohn-Lopez as Victor
Haley Mancini as Sydnie
Brandon Jay McLaren as Juwaan
Sonal Shah as Layla
Daniel-Ryan Spaulding as Evan
Marika Taylor as Jasmine
Yee Jee Tso as Nick
Jay Brazeau as Professor Grubbspeck
Olivia O'Lovely as Maid #1

References

External links

2010 films
2010s teen comedy films
American teen comedy films
CineTel Films films
2010s English-language films
National Lampoon films
Films directed by Savage Steve Holland
2010 comedy films
2010s American films